The 2013–14 Spanish football season was Sevilla Fútbol Club's 13th consecutive season in La Liga.

First team squad

Updated 16 October 2013

Transfers

Summer 2013

In

Out

Loans in

Loans out

Loan return

Promotion from youth system

Pre-season and friendlies

Competitions

La Liga

League table

Results summary

Results by round

Matches

Copa del Rey

Round of 32

UEFA Europa League

Third qualifying round

Play-off round

Group stage

Knockout phase

Round of 32

Round of 16

Quarter-finals

Semi-finals

Final

Statistics

Appearances and goals
Last updated on 14 May 2014

|-
! colspan=16 style=background:#dcdcdc; text-align:center|Goalkeepers

|-
! colspan=16 style=background:#dcdcdc; text-align:center|Defenders

|-
! colspan=16 style=background:#dcdcdc; text-align:center|Midfielders

|-                       
! colspan=16 style=background:#dcdcdc; text-align:center|Forwards

|-
! colspan=16 style=background:#dcdcdc; text-align:center| Players who have made an appearance this season but have left the club

|}

References 

2013–14
Spanish football clubs 2013–14 season
2013–14